Brockhill Taylor (died 1636) was a member of Parliament for Cavan Borough from 1634 to 1635 in the Irish House of Commons.

In 1609 his father, John Taylor from Cambridge, had received the patentee of Ballyhaise, namely  of arable land in Barony of Loughtee. The new landowners replaced the existing Irish cultivators with peasant farmers from England and Scotland. They were also barred from selling their lands to any Irishman.

He was grandfather of Richard Pockrich (MP for Monaghan County) (1713–14)

He was grandfather of Colonel Brockhill Newburgh (MP for Cavan County 1715-27).

References

Year of birth missing
1636 deaths
Members of the Parliament of Ireland (pre-1801) for County Cavan constituencies
Irish MPs 1634–1635